The 1942 All-Ireland Senior Hurling Championship was the 56th staging of the All-Ireland Senior Hurling Championship, the Gaelic Athletic Association's premier inter-county hurling tournament. The championship began non 3 May 1942 and ended on 3 September 1942.

The championship was won by Cork who secured the title following a 2–14 to 3–4 defeat of Dublin in the All-Ireland final. This was their 13th All-Ireland title.

Cork were also the defending champions and retained the title for the fifth time in their history.

Teams

Overview

Six teams contested the Leinster championship while five teams contested the Munster championship. Galway, who faced no competition in their own province, entered the championship at the All-Ireland semi-final stage.  No team from Ulster participated in the senior championship.

Team summaries

Results

Leinster Senior Hurling Championship

Munster Senior Hurling Championship

First round

Semi-finals

Final

All-Ireland Senior Hurling Championship

Semi-final

Final

Championship statistics

Scoring

Widest winning margin: 22 points
Tipperary 5-13 : 1-3 Clare (Munster semi-final, 17 May 1942)
Most goals in a match: 11
Laois 5-3 : 6-2 Wexford (Leinster quarter-final, 3 May 1942)
Most points in a match: 18
Cork 2-14 : 3-4 Dublin (All-Ireland final, 3 September 1942)
Most goals by one team in a match: 6
Offaly 6-5 : 4-3 Westmeath (Leinster quarter-final, 2 May 1942)
Wexford 6-2 : 5-3 Laois (Leinster quarter-final, 3 May 1942)
Cork 6-8 : 2-4 Galway (Leinster quarter-final, 26 July 1942)
Most goals scored by a losing team: 5
Laois 5-3 : 6-2 Wexford (Leinster quarter-final, 3 May 1942)
Limerick 5-3 : 4-8 Cork (Munster semi-final, 21 June 1942)
Most points scored by a losing team: 4 
Wexford 4-4 : 5-5 Kilkenny (Leinster semi-final, 31 May 1942)
Offaly 1-4 : 4-7 Dublin (Leinster semi-final, 31 May 1942)
Galway 2-4 : 6-8 Cork (All-Ireland semi-final, 26 July 1942)
Dublin 3-4 : 2-14 Cork (All-Ireland final, 3 September 1942)

Sources
 Corry, Eoghan, The GAA Book of Lists (Hodder Headline Ireland, 2005).
 Donegan, Des, The Complete Handbook of Gaelic Games (DBA Publications Limited, 2005).
 Horgan, Tim, Christy Ring: Hurling's Greatest (The Collins Press, 2007).
 Nolan, Pat, Flashbacks: A Half Century of Cork Hurling (The Collins Press, 2000).
 Sweeney, Éamonn, Munster Hurling Legends (The O'Brien Press, 2002).

References

1942
All-Ireland Senior Hurling Championship